NGC 3741 is an irregular galaxy in the constellation Ursa Major. It was discovered by John Herschel on March 19, 1828. At a distance of about 10 million light-years (3.2 Mpc), it is located in the M94 Group. It is relatively undisturbed by other galaxies.

NGC 3741 is an unusual galaxy in several aspects. It has a disk of neutral hydrogen (H I) that is extremely wide, extending some 23,000 light-years (7 kpc). The disk is strongly but symmetrically warped. With a mass-to-light ratio of MT/LB ~ 149, it is highly rich in dark matter.

NGC 3741 has a central bar and a faint spiral arm rich in H I. The bar rotates slowly, likely due to interaction with the dark matter. The bar and spiral arms would make NGC 3741 a low-luminosity spiral galaxy. The unusual properties could be explained if NGC 3741 were a late-stage merger between a low-mass companion or if it accreted mass from the intergalactic medium.

References

External links
 

3741
07768
Ursa Major (constellation)
Irregular galaxies
035878
M94 Group